The medial compartment of thigh is one of the fascial compartments of the thigh and contains the hip adductor muscles and the gracilis muscle.

The obturator nerve is the primary nerve supplying this compartment. The obturator artery is the blood supply to the medial thigh.

The muscles in the compartment are:
 gracilis
 adductor longus
 adductor brevis
 adductor magnus

The obturator externus muscle is sometimes considered part of this group, and sometimes excluded. (Spatially, it is in this location, but functionally, it is more similar to the other lateral rotator group muscles).

The pectineus is sometimes included in this group, and sometimes excluded. It has the same function as the others in this group, but different innervation – namely, the femoral nerve.

References

External links
 

 
Animal anatomy